Agriphila microselasella is a moth in the family Crambidae. It was described by Stanisław Błeszyński in 1959. It is found in Iran.

References

Crambini
Moths described in 1959
Moths of Asia